Utta (Udta) is a rural locality (a selo) in the Yashkulsky District in the Republic of Kalmykia, Russia.
Utta was held by Germans for War during, August-December 1942.

References

Rural localities in Kalmykia
Yashkulsky District